Justice Hoyt may refer to:

William Lloyd Hoyt (born 1930), chief justice of New Brunswick
John Philo Hoyt (1841–1926), associate justice of the Washington Supreme Court

See also
Judge Hoyt (disambiguation)